BC Dinamo Tirana is an Albanian basketball team based in the country's capital Tiranë, which is the basketball department of multidisciplinary Dinamo Tirana. The club does not currently compete professionally but they have won the Albanian Basketball Superliga in 1995, and they have also won the Albanian Basketball Cup on six occasions between 1974 and 1999.

Domestic achievements 
Albanian Basketball Superliga (1): 
1995
Albanian Basketball Cup (6):
1974, 1979, 1986, 1991, 1992, 1993, 1999
Albanian Basketball Supercup (2):
2000, 2002

References

Dinamo Tirana
Sport in Tirana
Basketball teams established in 1950